Jamui is a district among 38 districts of Bihar state, India. The district was formed on 21 February 1991, when it was separated from Munger district. It is located at a longitude of 86° 13'E and the latitude is 24° 55'N.

The present collector and District Magistrate of Jamui is Shri Avanish Kumar Singh.

Resources
Topography: The soil pattern of the district differs widely due to topography of the region.
Forest: The District contains 204734 acre forest which covers 21.28% of the total area.
Minerals: one of the important district in Bihar where different types of ores & Minerals are found.
Gold: 44 percent of the country's gold is in the Sono area of ​​Jamui district.
Bihar has the largest gold reserves in the country. It was told that there is a total primary gold ore reserves of 501.83 tonnes in the country, of which 654.74 tonnes are gold metal, of which 44 percent gold has been found only in Bihar. In the Sono field of Jamui district of the state, 222.885 million tonnes of gold metal reserves including 37.6 tonnes of metal ore have been found.

History 

 Various literature indicates the fact that Jamui was known as Jambhiyaagram. According to Jains, the 24th Tirthankara lord Mahavira attained omniscience (Kevala Jnana) in Jambhiyagram situated on the bank of river named Ujjihuvaliya. Another place traced as "Jrimbhikgram" on the bank of Rijuvalika river, resembles Jambhiyagram, Ujjhuvaliya.

The Hindi translation of the words Jambhiya and Jrimbhikgram is Jamuhi which is developed in the recent time as Jamui.

With the passage of time, the river Ujhuvaliya /Rijuvalika is supposed to be developed as the river Ulai and as such both the place are still found in Jamui . The Ulai river is still flowing nearby Jamui. The old name of Jamui has been traced as Jambhubani in a copper plate which has been kept in Patna Museum. This plate clarifies that in the 12th century, Jambhubani was today's Jamui. Thus, the two ancient names as Jambhiyagram and Jambubani prove that this district was important as a religious place for Jains, and it was also a place of Gupta Empire.

In the 19th century; the historian Buchanan also visited this place in 1811 and found the historical facts. According to other historians Jamui, was also famous in the era of the Mahabharata.

According to available literature, Jamui was related to Gupta and Pala rulers before the 12th century. But after that this place became famous for Chandel rulers. Prioror to Chandel Raj, this place was ruled by Nigoria, who was defeated by Chandels and the dynasty of Chandela founded in the 13th century. The kingdom of Chandels spread over the whole of Jamui.

According to Joseph David Freedone Melik Beglar there is the ruin of an old fort in indpe which belongs to Nigoria ruler.

Chirag Paswan is the current Member of Parliament from Jamui.

The district is currently a part of the Red Corridor.

Geography
The district has untapped reserves of resources including mica, coal, gold and iron ore.Situated along the Bihar-Jharkhand border, Jamui is dotted with hills and the small retreat town of Simultala falls within the Jhajha block, on the main Delhi-Howrah rail line. Minto Tower in Gidhaur is a prime example of architecture from the period.

Politics 
  

|}

Tourism

Jain Mandir Lachhuar: This is a large and old rest house (dharmsala) of 65 rooms constructed for the Jain pilgrims. There is a Mandir of Lord Mahavira inside the dhamsala. The idol in this temple is more than 2,600 years old. This black stone idol is of weighs around 250 kg.  This is situated on the way of Kshatriya Kund Gram, the birthplace of Lord Mahavira. This place is located in Sikandra Block which is about 20 km west from Jamui District Headquarter.

Jhumraj sthan ,Batiya: there is temple of Baba jhumraj located in Batiya (under Sono police station) which is about almost 50 km from Jamui and 55 km from Deoghar..this is one of the most famous temple and crowded temple in Bihar ..where people gathering for their wish and offering male goat as a oblation. Ujju ULA

Giddheswar Temple: Temple of lord Shiva situated on the top of stone boulders. It is 15 km south from the district headquarter.

Simultalla hill station: This place is supposed to be the Tapo-Bhumi of Sri Ramakrishna Paramhamsa, who founded Tara Math of Devi Bhagvati.

Kali Mandir Malaypur: Temple of goddess Kali is situated at village Malaypur, block Barhat. A festival known as Kali Mela is held every year at this place. The temple is just near by the Railway station, Jamui.

Minto Tower Gidhaur: Minto tower was built by the Maharaja of Gidhaur in 1909 to commemorate the visit of the then British Viceroy Lord Irwin to Gidhaur. It is in the middle of Gidhaur Market on the main Jamui-Jhajha state highway.

Patneswar Mandir: This temple of Lord Shiva is situated on the way of Station Road Jamui. It is about 5 km north from the district headquarter Jamui.

Maa netula temple: This is a temple of Maa Netula Situated at village kumar, block sikandra. It is about 26 km west form the district headquarter 
jamui bihar. Million of devotees come here and pray .

Bhim Bandh: It is located between Lakshmipur and Haveli Kharagpur Jungle. Here the visitors find many source of hot water. This is a picnic spot in winter season from October to February.

Shiv Mandir: It is situated in Harla jury of Lakshmipur block. It is a temple of lord Shiva in Lakshmipur block. It is about 500m southward from Lakshmipur market.

Kali Mandir Lakshmipur: Temple of goddess Kali is situated in Harla jury of Lakshmipur block. A temple of goddess Kali in this block. It is about 600m southward from Lakshmipur main market.

Khaira Fort:
This fort was built by Khaira-Jamui Chandel rulers. Another fort of Chandel rulers of Gidhor-Jamui was built at Gidhaur.Both Chandel dynasty was related to each other and split during period of Emperor Jahagir, Mughal Rulers of Delhi. Chandela Rulers of Jamui came originally from Mahoba, Uttar Pradesh in 13th century AD and defeated ruler of later Pala dynasty of the region. By
Adv. Shakil Akhtar practice law at Supreme Court of India is a
Scion of Mircha State, s part of Khaira-Jamui State of Chandela. Late Rajasthan Pratap Narayan Singh who after conversion to Islam in 19th century came to be known as Abdulla Rehman Khan established Mircha State, the Zamindar/Raja of Mircha State, Jamui. His famous  grandson was Late Prof Akhtar Alam Khan of K.K.M College Jamui & father of Adv. Shakil Akhtar.Mobile No.9717214471.

Economy
In 2006 the Ministry of Panchayati Raj named Jamui one of the country's 250 most backward districts (out of a total of 640). It is one of the 36 districts in Bihar currently receiving funds from the Backward Regions Grant Fund Programme (BRGF).

Administrative units
 No. of Police District 1
 No. of Sub-Divisions 1
 No. of Police Sub-Divisions 2
 No. of Blocks 10
 No. of Circles 10
 No. of Police Stations 12
 No. of Panchayats 153
 No. of Villages 1,528

Blocks

Demographics

According to the 2011 census Jamui district has a population of 1,760,405, roughly equal to the nation of The Gambia or the US state of Nebraska. This gives it a ranking of 273rd in India (out of a total of 640). Its population growth rate over the decade 2001–2011 was 25.54%. Jamui has a sex ratio of 921 females for every 1000 males, and a literacy rate of 62.16%. 8.26% of the population live in urban areas. Scheduled Castes and Scheduled Tribes make up 17.19% and 4.48% of the population respectively.

At the time of the 2011 Census of India, 73.37% of the population in the district spoke Hindi, 6.81% Urdu, 5.94% Khortha, 3.66% Santali and 3.06% Magahi as their first language. 7.02% of the population spoke languages recorded as 'Others' under Hindi under Hindi on the census.

Transport

Jamui Railway Station, station code JMU, is one of the major railway stations in Danapur division of East Central Railway. Jamui is connected to metropolitan areas of India, by the Delhi-Kolkata Main Line via Mugalsarai-Patna route which runs along the historic Grand Trunk road.

Jamui Station serves the headquarters of Jamui district in the Indian state of Bihar. Railways and roads are the main means of transport in the region. The Jamui railway station is in Howrah-Patna-Mughalsarai main line. Most of the Patna, Barauni bound express trains coming from Howrah, Sealdah, Ranchi, Tatanagar stop here.

Culture

Museum
Chandrashekhar Singh Sangrahalaya founded on 16 March 1983.Total number of archaeological remains in this museum is 178. Various statues of Lord Vishnu, Lord Buddha, Goddess Uma, Durga, Surya, ancient rocks and terracotta seals etc. are available.

Flora and fauna

Sports
Jamui District is progressing very fast in the field of Sports and Games. The organizations like Jamui district Amateur Athletics Association, District Football Association, District Women Football Association, District Cricket Association, District Kabaddi Association etc. are actively participating in promotion. of games and sports. The existence of such large number of associations and organizations concerned with such a large variety of sports & games points to the vitality, interest & involvement of the local people in these fields. The leadership provided by Lt. Parasnath Bariyar, Tapeshwar Pd. Bariyar, Hoda Sahed, Kamta Pd. Singh, Mr Vicky Kumar, Nathu Ram, Kaushal Kumar Yadav and Kedar Pd. Singh in field of sports and games had raised the position of Jamui to the state level as early as two or three decades ago. And now our jamui is representing National and International level with rifle shooters Shreyasi Singh and Kumar Divya.

Recently, 1st District Level Athletics Meet, 11th State Level President Cup Football Tournament, Late Shukra Das Cricket Tournament has been organized successfully.

There are two stadiums namely Jamui Stadium, Jamui & Kumar Surendra Pratap Singh Stadium, Gidhaur and one Special Area Game Centre at Gidhaur in the district.

References

External links

 Official website
 Jamui Information Portal

 
Districts of Bihar
1991 establishments in Bihar